Sergio García Ramírez (born February 1, 1938) is a Mexican jurist and politician who currently serves as a judge at the Inter-American Court of Human Rights.

Born in Guadalajara, Jalisco, García Ramírez undertook his university studies at the school of law of the National Autonomous University of Mexico (UNAM) in Mexico City. He obtained his bachelor's degree in 1963 with an honorable mention, and he obtained his Ph.D. in 1971, receiving the first Magna cum laude awarded for a UNAM Ph.D. in law.
He is an official investigator in the Institute of Juridical Investigations and an official professor in the School of Law of the same university. He is a National Investigator, level III, in the National System of Investigators. Since 1993 he has been a member of the Governing Board of the UNAM.

Political career
García Ramírez has been a member of the Institutional Revolutionary Party (PRI) since 1961.  He occupied different positions under the PRI regime and served in the cabinet of President José López Portillo as Secretary of Labor and then in the cabinet of President Miguel de la Madrid as Attorney General. In 1988 he lost the PRI internal bid for the party presidential candidacy against Carlos Salinas de Gortari.
García Ramírez has never been elected to public office

References

External links
 Inter-American Court website

1938 births
Living people
20th-century Mexican judges
21st-century Mexican judges
Mexican Secretaries of Labor
Politicians from Guadalajara, Jalisco
National Autonomous University of Mexico alumni
Inter-American Court of Human Rights judges
Mexican judges of international courts and tribunals
Attorneys general of Mexico